Éric Bouvier (born ) is a former French male volleyball player. He was part of the France men's national volleyball team at the 1988 Summer Olympics and 1992 Summer Olympics. He also played at the 1986 FIVB Volleyball Men's World Championship in France and 1990 FIVB Volleyball Men's World Championship in Brazil. He played for ASU Lyon.

Clubs
 ASU Lyon (1990)

References

1961 births
Living people
French men's volleyball players
Place of birth missing (living people)
Olympic volleyball players of France
Volleyball players at the 1992 Summer Olympics
Volleyball players at the 1988 Summer Olympics
Emlyon Business School alumni